Fred Beyeler was born 5 November 1965 in Wellington. Beyeler attended Rongotai College from 1979 to 1983. He was a New Zealand cricketer who played 18 first-class matches for the Wellington Firebirds in the late 1980s.

References

External links

1965 births
Living people
New Zealand cricketers
Wellington cricketers
20th-century New Zealand people